Jerrol Lynn Williams (born July 5, 1967) is a former American football linebacker in the National Football League (NFL). He was drafted by the Pittsburgh Steelers in the fourth round of the 1989 NFL Draft. He played college football at Purdue.

Williams also played for the San Diego Chargers, Kansas City Chiefs, and Baltimore Ravens.

Williams' son, Jerrol Garcia-Williams, played college football at Hawaii and played two seasons with the Denver Broncos.

1967 births
American football linebackers
Baltimore Ravens players
Kansas City Chiefs players
Living people
Pittsburgh Steelers players
Players of American football from Nevada
Purdue Boilermakers football players
San Diego Chargers players
Sportspeople from Las Vegas